Nihat Türkmenoğlu (born 5 June 1988) is a Turkish Paralympian archer competing in the Men's compound bow W1 event.
He is competing at the 2020 Summer Paralympics in the individual W1 and Mixed team W1 events. He won the silver medal in the Individual W1 event.

He won two medals at the 2022 World Para Archery Championships held in Dubai, United Arab Enirates, a silver medal in the Men W1 event and a gold medal in the Men W1 Doubles event together with his teammate Yiğit Caner Aydın.

References

1988 births
Living people
Sportspeople from Kilis
Turkish male archers
Paralympic archers of Turkey
Wheelchair category Paralympic competitors
Archers at the 2020 Summer Paralympics
Paralympic silver medalists for Turkey
Paralympic medalists in archery
Medalists at the 2020 Summer Paralympics
Islamic Solidarity Games medalists in archery
21st-century Turkish people